Athletes from the Netherlands competed at the 1968 Winter Olympics in Grenoble, France.

Medalists

Speed skating

Men

Women

References
Official Olympic Reports
International Olympic Committee results database
Olympic Winter Games 1968, full results by sports-reference.com

Nations at the 1968 Winter Olympics
1968
W